Hywel ab Owain Gwynedd (circa 11201170), Prince of Gwynedd in 1170, was a Welsh poet and military leader.  Hywel was the son of Owain Gwynedd, prince of Gwynedd, and an Irishwoman named Pyfog. In recognition of this, he was also known as Hywel ap Gwyddeles (Hywel son of the Irishwoman). Hywel is also known as the Poet Prince for his bardic skills.

Biography

Military campaigns
Hywel's father Owain and uncle Cadwaladr came to blows in 1143 when Cadwaladr was implicated in the murder of Prince Anarawd ap Gruffydd of Deheubarth, Owain's ally and future son-in-law, on the eve of Anarawd's wedding to Owain's daughter. Owain followed a diplomatic policy of binding other Welsh rulers to Gwynedd through dynastic marriages, and Cadwaladr's border dispute and murder of Anarawd threatened Owain's efforts and credibility.

As ruler of Gwynedd, Owain stripped Cadwaladr of his lands assigning them to Hywel in 1139, and dispatched Hywel to Ceredigion where he burned Cadwaladr's castle at Aberystwyth, Hywel drove his uncle out in 1143. Cadwaladr fled to Ireland and hired a Norse fleet from Dublin, bringing the fleet to Abermenai to compel Owain to reinstate him. Taking advantage of the brotherly strife, and perhaps with the tacit understanding of Cadwaladr, the marcher lords mounted incursions into Wales. Realizing the wider ramifications of the war before him, Owain came to terms and reconciled, with Cadwaladr restored to his lands in 1144. Hywel and Cadell ap Gruffydd of Deheubarth joined forces against the Normans in west Wales, they took Carmarthen, Llanstephan, and Wiston castles. Peace between the brothers held until 1147, when an unrecorded event occurred which led Owain's sons Hywel and Cynan to drive Cadwaladr out of Meirionydd and Ceredigion, with Cadwaladr retreating to Môn. Meanwhile Hywel took Llanrhystud capturing Cadwaladr's son Cadfan in 1150. Again an accord was reached, with Cadwaladr retaining Aberffraw until a more serious breach occurred in 1153, when he was forced into exile in England, where his wife was the sister of Gilbert de Clare, 2nd Earl of Hertford, and the niece of Ranulph de Gernon, 2nd Earl of Chester. In 1157 Hywel is with his father, Owain Gwynedd on a campgaign against Henry II of England in Basingwerk. Then in 1159 Hywel accompanies a Norman force from Carmarthen castle against Lord Rhys of Deheubarth, and then afterwards, Hywel goes into revolt against Henry II. These actions seemed to be promoted by Owain Gwynedd, and also a desire to keep on good terms with the Crown.

Heir of Gwynedd
In 1146, news reached Prince Owain ap Gruffydd of Gwynedd that his favoured eldest son and heir, the edling, Rhun, died. Owain was overcome with grief, falling into a deep melancholy from which none could console him, until news reached him that Mold castle in Tegeingl (Flintshire) had fallen to Gwynedd, "[reminding Owain] that he had still a country for which to live," wrote historian Sir John Edward Lloyd.{{#tag:ref|Lloyd, J.E. A History of Wales, Rhun's death, page 96.|group=hyw}}
 
As the eldest surviving son and Edling, Hywel succeeded his father in 1170 as Prince of Gwynedd in accordance with Welsh law and custom. However, the new prince was immediately confronted by a coup instigated by his step-mother Cristin, Dowager Princess of Gwynedd. The dowager princess plotted to have her eldest son Dafydd usurp the Throne of Gwynedd from Hywel, and with Gwynedd divided between Dafydd and her other son Rhodri. The speed with which Cristin and her sons acted suggest that the conspiracy may have had roots before Owain's death. Additionally, the complete surprise of the elder sons of Owain suggests that the scheme had been a well kept secret.

Within months of his succession, Hywel was forced to flee to Ireland, returning later that year with a Hiberno-Norse army and landing on Môn, where he may have had Maelgwn's support. Dafydd himself landed his army on the island and caught Hywel off guard at Pentraeth, defeating his army and killing Hywel. Following Hywel's death and the defeat of the legitimist army, the surviving sons of Owain came to terms with Dafydd. Iorwerth was apportioned the commotes of Arfon and Arllechwedd, with his seat at Dolwyddelan, with Maelgwn retaining Ynys Môn, and with Cynan receiving Meirionydd. However, by 1174, Iorwerth and Cynan were both dead and Maelgwn and Rhodri were imprisoned by Dafydd, who was now master over the whole of Gwynedd.

Poetry
The seven sons of Hywel's foster-father, Cadifor, were killed while defending him in this battle, and were commemorated in verse:The sons of Cadifor, a noble band of brothersIn the hollow above PentraethWere full of daring and of high purposeThey were cut down beside their foster-brother.Hywel was an accomplished poet and eight of his poems have been preserved, and are printed in The Myvyrian Archaiology of Wales. The best known is probably Gorhoffedd Hywel ab Owain Gwynedd in which he praises his father's kingdom of Gwynedd, both its natural beauties and its beautiful women. Other poems include the earliest known love poetry in the Welsh language, and may show a French influence.

Family
Hywel is known to have sired the following sons:

 Gruffudd ap Hywel ab Owain Gwynedd
 Caswallawn ap Hywel ab Owain Gwynedd

In fiction

Hywel appears in the historical mystery novel The Summer of the Danes, one of the Cadfael Chronicles by Ellis Peters.
Hywel ab Owain is also written about in Sharon Kay Penman's novels When Christ and His Saints Slept, and Time and Chance''.

References

Notes

Books cited

See also

 Hywel ab Owain Gwynedd at Welsh language Wikisource

1170 deaths
Welsh-language poets
12th-century Welsh poets
Welsh royalty
Medieval Welsh killed in battle
12th-century Welsh monarchs
Year of birth unknown
Welsh people of Irish descent
12th-century Welsh military personnel